Minna Kaisa Aaltonen (17 September 1966 – 11 September 2021) was a Finnish actress. She played Marianne in London's Burning, Ingrid Coates in Dream Team, and appeared in Kotikatu, The Bill, Dalziel and Pascoe, and Lexx. She also appeared in beer ads in Ireland and in a small part as a newsreader in the James Bond movie Tomorrow Never Dies. In 1994 she was a host of Gladiaattorit (Finnish Gladiators).

References

1966 births
2021 deaths
20th-century Finnish actresses
Actors from Turku
Finnish film actresses
Finnish television actresses